The Räuber is the eleventh album by the German hard rock band Bonfire. It was released in 2008 by LZ Records.  The band collaborated with P.W. Politz to create a rock opera called The Räuber that debuted in Ingolstadt, Germany, in March 2008. The opera itself featured the band performing all the songs and went sold out for several weeks. A DVD was released in August 2008 that contained the opera performance as well as a full length concert by the band. The album features music in both English and German.

Track listing

Band members
Claus Lessmann - lead vocals, rhythm guitar
Hans Ziller - lead, rhythm & acoustic guitars
Chris Limburg - guitars
Uwe Köhler - bass
Jürgen Wiehler - drums, percussion

References
 BBillboard.com - Discography - Bonfire - The Rauber
 - See News for reference to The Rauber performance in Ingolstadt, Germany

Bonfire (band) albums
2008 albums
Rock operas